The ASEA electric locomotive was an electric locomotive type originally operated by Ferrocarriles Vascongados in the Basque Country, Spain. When that company was absorbed by FEVE, it came to be known as the FEVE 4100 series. It was later operated by Euskotren.

History
Ferrocarriles Vascongados had bought ten Brown Boveri electric locomotives in 1927. These were insufficient to haul all the freight trains operated by the company, and thus four new locomotives were ordered to Swedish manufacturer ASEA. The mechanical parts were built by Spanish manufacturer CAF in Beasain. The first two locomotives were delivered in 1931, and the remaining two in 1932. Due to the company's liquidity problems, eleven of its steam locomotives had to be mortgaged. In 1950, the company bought from ASEA another three locomotives which were mechanically similar to the ones delivered in the early 1930s.

After the original operator was absorbed into FEVE in 1972, the locomotives were renumbered as 4101 to 4104. It was during this time that the locomotives had their original axleboxes changed by new ones manufactured by Timken, the most significant overhaul during their lifetime. After the establishment of Euskotren in 1982 (known at the time as ET/FV), they were transferred to the new company. They were mostly retired from service in 1989, when two of the locomotives were scrapped and a third was stored for preservation. The fourth locomotive was refurbished with the addition of a Scharfenberg coupler and a Faiveley pantograph. It was in use as a shunter in the San Sebastián-Hendaye line until in 2016, when it was donated to the Basque Railway Museum.

Numbering and naming
The locomotives were named after mountains of the Basque Country. Their individual details are as follows.

See also
 Ferrocarriles Vascongados § Rolling stock

References

External links
 

Electric locomotives of Spain
Euskotren rolling stock
Ferrocarriles Vascongados rolling stock
FEVE rolling stock
Railway locomotives introduced in 1931
ASEA locomotives
CAF rolling stock
Bo′Bo′ locomotives
Bo-Bo locomotives
Metre gauge electric locomotives
1500 V DC locomotives